H. neglecta may refer to:
 Helicia neglecta, a plant species endemic to Papua New Guinea
 Hydrobia neglecta, a small brackish water snail species found in Europe

See also
 Neglecta (disambiguation)